Fabio Hernán Rodríguez Hernández (born 21 September 1966 in Cogua) is a Colombian former professional road cyclist. He most notably won the Vuelta a los Valles Mineros in 1993 and the Clásico RCN in 1991.

Major results
1989
 5th Overall Vuelta a Colombia
 5th Overall Clásico RCN
1991
 1st Overall Clásico RCN
1993
 1st Overall Vuelta a los Valles Mineros
1994
 5th GP Industria & Artigianato
1995
 10th Overall Vuelta a Colombia

Grand Tour general classification results timeline

References

1966 births
Living people
Colombian male cyclists
People from Cundinamarca Department